Turnverein Building may refer to various clubhouse and gymnasium buildings in the United States constructed for the Turners, including:

Turnverein Building in San Antonio, Texas
Turnverein Building in Denver, Colorado designed by George Louis Bettcher
Germania Turnverein Building in Lancaster, Pennsylvania
Independent Turnverein building in Indianapolis, Indiana
South Side Turnverein Hall in Indianapolis, Indiana
Athenæum (Das Deutsche Haus) in Indianapolis
Turnverein Building in Portland Oregon (demolished) designed by Claussen and Claussen
Turner Hall (Milwaukee) in Wisconsin
Mission Turn Hall (now The Women's Building) in San Francisco, California

See also
Turners#Turner Halls